Asatullo Nurulloev (born 21 June 1984) is a Tajikistani footballer who currently plays for Parvoz Bobojon Ghafurov, and the Tajikistan national football team.

He played for Tajikistan during the 2010 AFC Challenge Cup.

Career statistics

International

Statistics accurate as of match played 23 July 2013

References

External links
 

1984 births
Living people
Tajikistani footballers
Association football defenders
Tajikistan international footballers
Place of birth missing (living people)
Tajikistan Higher League players